Ponometia bicolorata is a species of bird-dropping moth in the family Noctuidae. It was first described by William Barnes and James Halliday McDunnough in 1912 and it is found in North America.

The MONA or Hodges number for Ponometia bicolorata is 9084.

References

Further reading

 
 
 

Acontiinae
Articles created by Qbugbot
Moths described in 1912